Quality Control Music (also known as Quality Control or QC) is an American hip hop record label founded by Kevin "Coach K" Lee (COO) and Pierre "P" Thomas (CEO) in March 2013. The label's releases are now distributed through Motown and Caroline, subsidiaries of the Capitol Music Group. Tamika Howard and Simone Mitchell are executives of the label, with Howard serving as its general manager.

The label has many acts signed, including Migos, Lil Yachty, Lil Baby, and the City Girls. The label also has Cardi B signed under a management deal.

Quality Control Music also operates a management agency, Solid Foundation Management (SFM), which manages artists including Trippie Redd.

History 
Kevin Lee and Pierre Thomas initially established Quality Control Music by hiring radio and promotion staff, while they personally ventured into publishing and management. They invested $1 million and one year into building a headquarters in the western part of Atlanta, which holds four recording studios and office spaces.

In 2020, Migos brought a lawsuit against the company.

On February 8, 2023, Quality Control's parent company, QC Media Holdings was acquired by Hybe America for $300 million with the founders maintaining control and reporting to the CEO, Scooter Braun.

Roster

Notable current acts 
Updated according to QC Music Artists.

Artists  

Migos
Quavo
Lil Baby
City Girls
Lil Yachty
Layton Greene
Duke Deuce
Bankroll Freddie
Lakeyah
Icewear Vezzo
Baby Money

In-house producers 

OG Parker
Quay Global

Notable former acts 
 Offset
 Rich The Kid
 OG Maco
 Young Greatness (Deceased)
Takeoff (Deceased)

Discography

Compilation albums

Mixtapes

Singles

Quality Control Sports 
In 2019, Kevin Lee and Pierre Thomas established Quality Control Sports, a sports management company. Quality Control Sports manages professional basketball, football and baseball players including Deebo Samuel, Alvin Kamara, Diontae Johnson (Pittsburgh Steelers) and Jarrett Allen.

References 

Record labels established in 2012
Companies based in Atlanta
American record labels
Hip hop record labels